Sajama may refer to:

Nevado Sajama, an extinct stratovolcano and the highest peak in Bolivia
Sajama National Park, a national park in Bolivia
Sajama Cut, a rock band from Jakarta, Indonesia
Sajama Lines, straight paths etched into the ground by the indigenous people living near Nevado Sajama
Sajama Province, a province in the Oruro Department, Bolivia

Highest points of countries